Koshksaray (also Romanized as Koshksarāy, Koshk Sarāy, Kashk Saray, Keshki-Sarai, Koghk Sarāy, Kūshg Sarāy, and Kūshk Sarāy) is a city in Koshksaray District of Marand County, East Azerbaijan province, Iran. At the 2006 census, its population was 7,439 in 1,858 households, when it was in the Central District. The following census in 2011 counted 7,723 people in 2,244 households. The latest census in 2016 showed a population of 8,060 people in 2,509 households. In 2019, the city and Koshksaray Rural District separated from the Central District to form the new district, of which the city is now the center.

References 

Marand County

Cities in East Azerbaijan Province

Populated places in East Azerbaijan Province

Populated places in Marand County